Vagn Peitersen (11 January 1925 – 12 April 2016) was a Danish field hockey player. He competed in the men's tournament at the 1960 Summer Olympics.

References

External links
 

1925 births
2016 deaths
Danish male field hockey players
Olympic field hockey players of Denmark
Field hockey players at the 1960 Summer Olympics
Sportspeople from Copenhagen